Ayoub El-Idrissi (born 23 October 1994) is a Qatari judoka. He competed in the 2020 Summer Olympics.

References

External links
 

1994 births
Living people
Sportspeople from Casablanca
Judoka at the 2020 Summer Olympics
Qatari male judoka
Olympic judoka of Qatar
Asian Games competitors for Qatar
Judoka at the 2018 Asian Games